Sinclair Greenwell Jr. (December 1935 - July 7, 1992) was an American jazz alto saxophonist. He was also known as Guido Sinclair, Sonny Harrison, and Junnie. He performed in Los Angeles, Chicago, and Champaign-Urbana, Illinois.

Biography 

Sinclair Greenwell was born in December 1935 in Fort Worth, Texas. He moved to Los Angeles, California in 1944. At Lafayette Junior High School he practiced Charlie Parker solos and met pianist Horace Tapscott. Greenwell and Tapscott formed a band with trumpeter Roy Brewster and drummer Charles Pendergraff while they attended Jefferson High School. Greenwell was a founding member of Tapscott's Pan Afrikan Peoples Arkestra in 1961 and played in the group until the mid-1980s.   He moved to Chicago to be with his father. Later, he moved to Champaign-Urbana, Illinois and married harpist Shirley Blankenship. When he lived in Champaign-Urbana, Greenwell wrote many musical papers and performed. These papers include his compositions and records of advertisements from his performances. He performed frequently at Nature's Table.

References

External links 

 . Shirley Meyer Blankenship Music and Papers, 1950-2009, at Sousa Archives and Center for American Music.

1935 births
1992 deaths
American jazz alto saxophonists
American male saxophonists
People from Champaign County, Illinois
20th-century American saxophonists
Jazz musicians from Illinois
20th-century American male musicians
American male jazz musicians